Greek Scriptures may refer to:
The New Testament
A translation of any Scripture into the Greek language, but especially the Septuagint translation of the Hebrew Scriptures, or Old Testament